This is a list of Finnish regions by GDP and GDP per capita.

List of regions by GDP 
Regions by GDP in 2015 according to data by the OECD.

List of regions by GDP per capita 
Counties by GDP per capita in 2015 according to data by the OECD.

References 

Regions by GDP
Gross state product
 GDP
Ranked lists of country subdivisions